Barbapapa: One Big Happy Family! (French: Barbapapa en famille !) is a French animated television series for children. The series serves as a reboot of the original Barbapapa television series based on the books of the same name by French-American couple Annette Tison and Talus Taylor. The series is a production of Normaal Animation, with the participation of TF1, Nickelodeon, Télé-Québec and RTS.

It deviates from the original series and its sequel, Barbapapa Around the Worlds five-minute episode format by extending the length of each episode to eleven minutes, which allows for more involved episode plots with more storytelling.

Premise
Barbapapa: One Big Happy Family! focuses on the daily lives of the members of the Barbapapa family, a group of shapeshifting blobs. Most of the episodes involve the family getting themselves into extraordinary and often humorous situations, such as building a rocket to Mars or the children trying to hide a pet elephant they found in the wild from their parents.

Each episode features a teachable moral that the characters learn from while on their adventures.

Characters
The Barbapapa family are the main characters of the series, consisting of two parents and seven children referred to as "Barbababies." 
 Barbapapa  — the titular character, the father of the Barbapapa family and a kind-hearted pink shapeshifting blob.
 Barbamama  — the mother of the Barbapapa family and a hardworking black shapeshifting blob.
 Barbabravo (in French: Barbidur)  — a red male Barbababy who is athletic but has a bit of an ego. 
 Barbabright (in French: Barbibul) — a blue male Barbababy who is a scientist.
 Barbabeau  (in French: Barbouille) — a black male Barbababy who is covered in fur and is an artist.
 Barbabelle — a purple female Barbababy who is vain and enjoys beauty.
 Barbalala — a green female Barbababy who has a calm attitude and likes music and performing.
 Barbalib (in French: Barbotine)  — a bespectacled, orange female Barbababy who loves reading and often serves as the voice of reason.
 Barbazoo (in French: Barbidou) — a yellow male Barbababy who is interested in animals and nature.

Cast

French 
 Bruno Magnes — Barbapapa
 Nathalie Karsenti — Barbamama
 Lucille Boudonnat — Barbalib
 Adeline Chetail — Barbabelle
 Youna Noiret — Barbabravo
 Fily Keita — Barbabright
 Kaycie Chase — Barbazoo
 Marie Facundo — Barbabeau
 Emmylou Homs — Barbalala
 Bernard Alane — Narrator

English 
Unlike the original French version, which uses adult voice actresses as the voices of all the Barbababies, child actors perform the voices of all the Barbababies. The dub was produced in the United Kingdom by Jungle Studios in British English.
 Oliver Britten — Barbapapa
 Harriet Carmichael — Barbamama
 Scarlett Keeble — Barbalib
 Molly O'Mahony — Barbabelle
 Felix Warren — Barbabravo
 William Barber — Barbabright
 Teddy West — Barbazoo
 Bruno Ben Tovim — Barbabeau
 Ynez Williams — Barbalala

The voice actor for Barbabravo was omitted in error from the credits in the original release of the English dub. The voice actor for the narrator is uncredited.

Episodes

(S1 Ep1a) The Barbapapa Tree: Barbapapa and Barbamama return to the tree where they were born.
(S1 Ep1b) The Barbababies Birthday: It's the Barbababies' Birthday. In the middle of their enjoyment, they overwork Barbapapa. 

(S1 Ep2a) Bada-Bam: Barbabright captures a melody from Mars, soon after he convinces his family to travel to said planet. 
(S1 Ep2b) The Barbamartians: The Barbapapas meet a family of Barbamartians. Beans planted by Barbabravo turns into a giant plant and attacks the village.

(S1 Ep3a) Boris: The Barbababies find a lost baby elephant and try to take care of him without Barbapapa and Barbamama knowing. 
(S1 Ep3b) Born To Be Wild: The Barbapapas decide to bring Boris back to Africa and help him acclimatise.

(S1 Ep4a) Making Bread: Barbapapa wants to teach his children to make bread but things don't go as planned.
(S1 Ep4b) From One Pit To Another: The Barbababies plant an avocado tree. However, it takes years before the first harvest. Barbabright has an idea to save time that lead to disaster.

(S1 Ep5a) The Tenderest Bond Of All: Barbabravo and Barbabright try to make a giant souffle, and other shenanigans caught on Barbalala's camera. 
(S1 Ep5b) The Orange Empire: The Barbapapas decide to go to the park. While her brothers and sisters play, Barbalib can't help but control everything.

(S1 Ep6a) It's Only A Mystery: Taking after his favourite detective, Barbabravo looks for a case to solve. Can he solve the mystery of the missing ice hippopotamus? 
(S1 Ep6b) The Battle: Inspired by their favourite heroes, the Barbababies make costumes and play. But no heroes are possible without villains.

(S1 Ep7a) Barbaprank!: It is pranks day. The Barbababies have fun finding new pranks...until Barbabright spots the tracks of a dinosaur. 
(S1 Ep7b) The Wolf of Halloween: For Halloween, the Barbababies play wolf and have fun scaring each other.

(S1 Ep8a) The Competition Prize: The Barbababies win a touchpad. They all want to use it and snaffle it one after another.
(S1 Ep8b) Marvellous Moustaches: Barbazoo and his siblings collect stickers of moustached celebrities. Unfortunately, it seems impossible to find the last one: Charles Horseshoe-Furlip. Barbazoo suspects a conspiracy!

(S1 Ep9a) Let Justice Be Done: Barbabeau forgot to return his book to the library. When Mr. Strict the librarian visits  Barbapapa to see the children's show and tell today, Barbabeau decides to run away to avoid a terrible sentence.
(S1 Ep9b) The Great Spring Clean Up: Barbamama wants the Barbababies to tidy their bedrooms. They're hiding to escape the drudgery.

Broadcast
Barbapapa: One Big Happy Family! was first announced in 2018 via a Nickelodeon press release, and began broadcasting in its native France beginning November 10, 2019 on TF1, as part of the TFOU programming block for children.

In honor of the 50th anniversary of the Barbapapa franchise as a whole, the series was released worldwide on Nickelodeon and Nick Jr. channels in over 100 territories throughout late 2020 and early 2021. This allowed for the series to be dubbed into a wide variety of languages, including some which the original Barbapapa series and Around the World have never been dubbed into before. The first countries to premiere the series outside of France were Italy, Germany and Austria.

With the English dub being produced in the United Kingdom, the series began airing on British television on July 10, 2021. The English dub also airs in Australia and New Zealand, as well as via secondary audio tracks in Italy, Germany, Austria and on Nick Jr.'s Global feed.

Yle TV2 in Finland premiered the series on January 1, 2021 as part of the Pikku Kakkonen programming block for children, making it the first non-Nickelodeon channel outside of the French-speaking world to air the series.

References 

2010s French animated television series
2020s French animated television series
2019 French television series debuts
Animated television series reboots
French children's animated comedy television series
French children's animated adventure television series
French computer-animated television series
French preschool education television series
French television shows based on children's books
Animated television series about children
Animated television series about families
Television series about shapeshifting